Francis Hamilton Stuart (20 July 19121 February 2007) was a former Australian public servant and diplomat.

Early life and education
Stuart was born in Melbourne on 20 July 1912. His parents separated when he was 8 years old and he went to live in Sydney with his mother as a child.  He later boarded at Geelong Grammar School and went on to higher education at Oxford University.

Career
He began his career in the 1930s as a consular officer in the British Legation in Bangkok. He shifted to the Australian Department of External Affairs in 1941. In 1942, he enlisted in the Australian Army to serve during World War II.

Between 1964 and 1957 Stuart was chief of protocol in the external affairs department in Canberra.

In May 1957, Stuart, along with his wife and children, left Canberra for Phnom Penh to take up his appointment as Australian Minister to Cambodia. His nomination had been approved by King Norodom Suramarit in April that year. The Australian Legation in Phnom Penh was raised to Embassy status in 1959 and Stuart became Ambassador.

Prime Minister Robert Menzies announced Stuart's appointment as Ambassador to the United Arab Republic in November 1961.

In May 1970 Stuart was appointed High Commissioner to Pakistan, with concurrent accreditation to Afghanistan. He left the Philippines in July 1970 to take up the post. Whilst resident in Pakistan, Stuart saw the partition of Pakistan.

In 1973, Stuart became the first resident Australian Ambassador to Poland.

Retirement and later life
In December 1989 Stuart's book Towards Coming of Age was published by Griffith University.

In his retirement, Stuart advocated for Australia to become a republic.

Stuart died on 1 February 2007.

References

1912 births
2007 deaths
Ambassadors of Australia to Cambodia
Ambassadors of Australia to East Germany
Ambassadors of Australia to Egypt
Ambassadors of Australia to the Philippines
Ambassadors of Australia to Poland
High Commissioners of Australia to Pakistan
People educated at Geelong Grammar School